Carl Eric Wickman (born Erik Wretman; August 7, 1887 – February 5, 1954) was the founder of Greyhound Lines.

Background 
Wickman was born Erik Wretman at Martisgården, a family farm located near the small village of Limbäck in the parish of Våmhus, 15 km north of Mora in the province Dalarna, Sweden. He was the son of the farmer Karl Viktor Wretman (1858-1947) and Anna Matsdotter (1862-1943) and the maternal grandson of the famous Swedish hair jewelry artist Martis Karin Ersdotter.  He was the eldest of five siblings and was commonly known as Martis Jerk ("Martis" is the farm name and "Jerk" is the dialectal form of the name Erik).

He changed his name to Carl Eric Wickman in 1905, when he arrived in the United States as a Swedish emigrant. His father Victor had earlier used the surname Wickman when he worked in the United States.

Career 
Wickman worked in a mine as a drill operator in Hibbing, Minnesota until he was laid off in 1914. In the same year, Wickman became a Hupmobile salesman as a partnership-owner. When he could not sell the first Hupmobile he received, he began operating a livery route from Hibbing and Alice, Minnesota. By using the seven multi-seat Hupmobile, he drove his former colleagues between the mines and homes. This was the start of what would later become the largest bus line in the United States, renamed "Greyhound Lines" in 1914.

In 1925, he bought a small line operating out of Superior, Wis., that was owned by Orville Swan Caesar (1892-1965).
Within a year the duo formed Northland Transportation Company. The company formally changed its name to The Greyhound Corporation in 1930.
By 1934, he had expanded to 50 buses and had revenues of $340,000. Wickman retired as president of Greyhound Corporation in 1946.  In 1952 he sold his interest in the  business for $960,000.

Personal life 
In 1916, Wickman married Olga Rodin (1897–1977). They had two children Robert (Bob) and Peggy (Margaret).  In 1940 King Gustav V of Sweden  awarded Wickman with the  Order of Vasa, first class.

He died aged 66 in 1954 and was buried at Lakewood Cemetery in Minneapolis, Minnesota.

Companies founded 
Mesaba Transportation Company – 1915
Motor Transit Corporation – 1922
Northland Transportation Company – 1925
Greyhound Pacific – around 1930
The Greyhound Corporation – 1930

References

Additional sources
Jackson, Carlton (1984)  Hounds of the Road: A History of the Greyhound Bus Company (Popular Press) 
Lundell, Kristin (2014) Busskungen- Svensken som grundade Greyhound (Stockholm: Norstedts) 
Sundquist, Nils  (1969) Martis Jerk, Eric Wickman 1887-1954: Våmhuspojken Som Blev USA:s Busskung (Malung: Malungs Boktryckeri AB)

Related reading
Lewis, Anne Gillespie (2004) Swedes in Minnesota  (Minnesota Historical Society Press) 

1887 births
1954 deaths
People from Dalarna
People in bus transport
American company founders
Swedish emigrants to the United States
Greyhound Lines
Hupmobile
American Lutherans
Knights First Class of the Order of Vasa
20th-century Lutherans